Mohan (simplified Chinese: 磨憨; Tai Lue:  Bo Han) is a border town in the south of Mengla County, Yunnan, China, directly on the border of Laos and China.

Administrative divisions 
Mohan is divided into 2 communities and 6 villages:

 Kouan Community
 Shangyong Community
 Shangyong Village
 Shanggang Village
 Manzhuang Village
 Molong Village
 Longmen Village
 Longgan Village

Transport
Mohan lies at the southern end (2,827 km) of China National Highway 213. It will be the interchange of two railway lines, the Yuxi–Mohan railway to China, and the Vientiane–Boten Railway to Laos, when both open in 2021.

Biodiversity
The surrounding area has 3890 plant species, and 756 animal species.

Climate

References

Township-level divisions of Xishuangbanna Dai Autonomous Prefecture
China-Laos border crossings